Annabelle Comes Home is a 2019 American supernatural horror film written and directed by Gary Dauberman, in his directorial debut, from a story by Dauberman and James Wan, who also served as producer with Peter Safran. It serves as a sequel to 2014's Annabelle and 2017's Annabelle: Creation, and as the seventh installment in The Conjuring Universe franchise. The film stars Mckenna Grace, Madison Iseman, and Katie Sarife, along with Vera Farmiga and Patrick Wilson, who reprise their roles as Ed and Lorraine Warren.

In early April 2018, Warner Bros. Pictures announced that a then-untitled film in the Conjuring Universe franchise would be released on July 3, 2019. Later that month, it was announced that the film would be another installment in the Annabelle series, with Dauberman signed on to write and direct the film in his directorial debut, based on a story treatment written by Dauberman and Wan. Principal photography commenced by mid-October and officially wrapped in December 2018 in Los Angeles.

Annabelle Comes Home was theatrically released in the United States on June 26, 2019, by Warner Bros. Pictures and New Line Cinema. It grossed over $231million worldwide and received mixed reviews from critics, who found it less frightening than its predecessors.

Plot 
Demonologists Ed and Lorraine Warren confiscate the Annabelle doll from nurses Debbie and Camilla, who claimed that the doll often performed violent activities in their apartment. During the drive back home, the doll summons spirits to attack Ed, but he narrowly survives. Annabelle is locked in a sacred glass case in the couple's artifacts room that is blessed by Father Gordon to ensure the evil is contained.

Sometime later, the Warrens welcome Mary Ellen, who will be in charge of babysitting their daughter, Judy, at the house while they travel overnight to investigate another case. At school, Judy notices a ghostly priest that begins following her. Mary Ellen's friend, Daniela, arrives uninvited to the Warrens' home, who is secretly curious about speaking to the dead. She sneaks into the artifacts room and starts examining every item, ultimately trying to contact her late father. She abruptly leaves Annabelle's glass case unlocked, and the terror begins shortly afterwards with the spirit of Annabelle "Bee" Mullins unleashed. That night, Annabelle begins releasing other spirits, such as the Ferryman, the Bride, a Feeley Meeley board game, and the Black Shuck.

Mary Ellen's crush, Bob Palmeri, arrives outside the house and serenades her, but is later attacked by the Black Shuck and hides with the chickens. The Black Shuck searches for him while walking around the place. Mary Ellen is tormented by the Ferryman, while Judy is confronted by Annabelle in her bedroom. Daniela had left earlier but sneaks back into the house to return the artifacts room's keys. She gets locked inside the room and tormented by various objects, such as a piano and an old television that can predict the near future. She finds the Mourner's Bracelet and sees her father twisted into a malevolent spirit. A bloody and screaming Daniela appears on the television screen after having answered a cursed telephone. The real Daniela later unwittingly reaches to answer the telephone but is interrupted just in time by Judy and Mary Ellen.

Judy explains that they must lock Annabelle in her case again so that the other spirits will rest. Bob protects Judy from the Black Shuck as she retrieves Mary Ellen's asthma inhaler, while Daniela is attacked and possessed by the Bride. Eventually, Mary Ellen and Judy find the doll when the ghostly priest, acting as Judy's guardian, guides them to the Ferryman. They manage to retrieve the glass case's key after they are attacked by demonic hands from the Feeley Meeley board game, and a possessed Daniela, but struggle to secure the case as the demon of the doll physically attacks them. Daniela recovers when Judy plays Ed's recorded footage of the Bride's exorcism, and helps put the doll back in the case. After the case is locked, the disturbances cease as the spirits return to their slumber, and Bob reunites with the trio.

Ed and Lorraine return the next morning, and the girls approach them to recount the eventful night. Later, many friends gather to celebrate Judy's birthday party. Daniela apologizes to Lorraine, who gives her a comforting message from her father.

Cast

Production

Development 
In early April 2018, Warner Bros. announced that a then-untitled film in the Conjuring Universe franchise would be released on July 3, 2019. Later that month, it was announced that the film would be another installment in the Annabelle series, with Gary Dauberman signed on to write and direct the film in his directorial debut, based on a story treatment written by Dauberman and James Wan. Wan and Peter Safran co-produced the project. During the 2018 San Diego Comic-Con, Wan and Safran revealed the film's events would take place after Annabelle and would focus on the doll after she had been placed in a glass case in the Warrens' museum. Dauberman later confirmed this, stating that the film would take place shortly after the beginning of The Conjuring where the titular character is introduced, but also before many of the events of the first installment.

In late September 2018, Mckenna Grace was cast in the film as Judy Warren, the Warrens' 10-year-old daughter, (replacing Sterling Jerins who played Judy Warren in The Conjuring and The Conjuring 2), and Madison Iseman as one of Judy's teenage babysitters. By October, Katie Sarife had joined the cast. That same month, it was announced Patrick Wilson and Vera Farmiga would reprise their roles as Ed and Lorraine Warren.

Filming 
Principal photography commenced by mid-October in Los Angeles, with Michael Burgess serving as cinematographer. On December 7, Wilson announced that he had finished filming his scenes. A week later, filming officially wrapped. In February 2019, Joseph Bishara—who composed the scores for The Conjuring, Annabelle, The Conjuring 2, and The Curse of La Llorona—was revealed to be scoring Annabelle Comes Home. On March 30, 2019, Kirk M. Morri was announced as the film's editor.

Release 
Annabelle Comes Home was theatrically released in the United States on June 26, 2019, by Warner Bros. Pictures and New Line Cinema. It was originally scheduled for release on July 3, 2019, but was later moved up to June 28, and then to June 26. The studio spent a total of $77 million promoting the film. The film is dedicated to Lorraine Warren, who died on April 18, 2019. Annabelle Comes Home was released on Digital HD on September 17, 2019, and on Blu-ray and DVD on October 8, 2019. It was released in a May 2022 Blu-ray collection with the other The Conjuring Universe movies.

Reception

Box office 
Annabelle Comes Home grossed $74.2million in the United States and Canada, and $157.1million in other territories, for a worldwide total of $231.3million. Deadline Hollywood calculated the net profit of the film to be $64million, when factoring together all expenses and revenues.

In the United States and Canada, the film was projected to gross $30–35million from 3,587 theaters over its first five days. It made $7.2million on its first day, a Wednesday, including $3.5million from Tuesday night previews, the third-best total of any Conjuring installment. It then made $3.6million on its second day of release for a two-day total of $10.8million. It went on to debut to $20.3million (a five-day total of $31.2million), finishing second at the box office, behind holdover Toy Story 4, and marking the lowest start of any Conjuring film. In its second weekend, the film dropped 52% and grossed $9.8million, finishing in fifth.

Critical response 
The site's critical consensus reads, "Fun for fans even if it isn't as frightening as some of its predecessors, Annabelle Comes Home suggests there's still some life left in the Conjuring franchise." Audiences polled by CinemaScore gave the film an average grade of "B−" on an A+ to F scale, while those at PostTrak gave it an average 2.5 out of 5 stars, and a 42% "definite recommend".

Accolades 
Two crew members were nominated for their work on the film. Leah Butler was nominated in the Best Costume Design category at the 2019 Fright Meter Awards.
Gary Dauberman was nominated as Legion M Breakthrough Director at the 2019 Saturn Awards.

Future 
Prior to the release of the film in June 2019, Dauberman commented on the possibility of another film in the Annabelle series: "I didn't look at this process ... going, 'What other stuff can we absolutely spin-off into other movies?' [It's about] what works for this movie, and then if people seem to dig it, then we'll go from there." Safran also commented on the possibility, stating that they will continue to develop and create films "as long as [they] keep having original stories to tell. The moment that you start repeating yourself and really diluting the good will that exists out there, then it's the beginning of the end."

References

External links 
 
 

2010s English-language films
2010s supernatural horror films
2019 directorial debut films
2019 films
2019 horror thriller films
American ghost films
American horror drama films
American horror thriller films
American mystery horror films
American sequel films
American supernatural horror films
Demons in film
Film spin-offs
Films about exorcism
Films about haunted dolls
Films about nannies
Films about sentient toys
Films about spirit possession
Films produced by James Wan
Films produced by Peter Safran
Films scored by Joseph Bishara
Films set in 1968
Films set in 1972
Films set in Connecticut
Films shot in Los Angeles
Films with screenplays by Gary Dauberman
Horror films about toys
2010s mystery horror films
New Line Cinema films
Interquel films
The Conjuring Universe
Warner Bros. films
2010s American films
American prequel films